Malmi is a village on the island of Munapirtti in the municipality of Pyhtää, Kymenlaakso, Southern Finland.

External links
Webpage of the island of Mogenpört, in Swedish and Finnish

Pyhtää
Villages in Finland